Robert Williams was a Scottish professional footballer who made over 110 appearances in the Scottish League for Airdrieonians as a right half.

Personal life 
Williams enlisted as a private in the Royal Scots Fusiliers in February 1916, during the First World War. He was killed on the Western Front on 31 August 1916 and is commemorated on the Thiepval Memorial.

References

External links 

 

Scottish footballers
1916 deaths
British Army personnel of World War I
Year of birth missing
Scottish Football League players
Airdrieonians F.C. (1878) players
Place of birth missing
Royal Scots Fusiliers soldiers
British military personnel killed in the Battle of the Somme
People from Ayrshire
Association football midfielders
Scottish military personnel